Phạm is the fourth most common Vietnamese family name from , which may be rendered as Fan in Chinese or Beom (범) in Korean. It is not to be confused with Phan (潘), another Vietnamese surname.

Origin
Phạm is the Sino-Vietnamese reading of the Chữ Hán  (fàn 'plants, grass' or 'models, limits, pattern').

Frequency
Phạm is a very prevalent last name in Vietnam.
Among the global ethnic Vietnamese population, it is the fifth-most common name, accounting for 5% of the approximately 75 million people. It is also quite common in the United States, shared by around 82,000 citizens.
It is the 951st most common surname in France and the 455th most common in Australia.

People
Notable people with the surname Phạm include:

Science
Phạm Tuân, first Vietnamese cosmonaut
Frédéric Pham, Vietnamese French mathematician (ref. Brieskorn–Pham manifold)
Kathy Pham, computer scientist 
Phạm Đình Hổ - inventor of Vietnamese Chinese Characters Chữ Nôm
Politics and Military
Phạm Công Trứ, mandarin of the Le and Trinh dynasties
Phạm Ngũ Lão, prominent general under Trần Hưng Đạo
Phạm Văn Đồng Prime Minister of North Vietnam (1955–1976) and reunified Vietnam (1976–1987)
Hung Pham, politician from Alberta, Canada
Pham Le Bong, foreign minister to Bảo Đại (last emperor of Vietnam)
Phạm Ngọc Thảo, colonel in the Army of the Republic of Vietnam, communist spy
Phạm Phú Quốc, Republic of Vietnam Air Force pilot involved in 1962 South Vietnamese Independence Palace bombing

Phạm Văn Phú, ARVN general
Phạm Quang Khiêm, VNAF 1st lieutenant who was bast known for stealing C-130A for freedom before the Fall of Saigon
Khanh Pham, American politician

Arts and entertainment
Phạm Duy, composer and songwriter
Linh Dan Pham, French Vietnamese actress
Hoa Pham, Australian author
Phạm Phi Nhung, Vietnamese American singer
Quang X. Pham, author
Andrew X. Pham, author
Thái Thanh, 20th century Vietnamese singer, real name Phạm Thị Băng Thanh
Phạm Thị Hoài, author
Phạm Xuân Thái, Vietnamese linguist
Phạm Xuân Ẩn, Vietnamese journalist and communist spy from South Vietnam
Phạm Xuân Nguyên, pen name Ngân Xuyên, Vietnamese writer and literary translator
Elyzabeth Pham, American Miss Wisconsin USA 1999
Phạm Hương, Miss Universe Vietnam 2015 Winner
Phạm Thị Thanh Hằng, Actress, TV Host & Model

Sports
Thierry Pham, French professional tennis player
Phạm Thành Lương, Vietnamese football (Soccer) player
Phạm Đức Huy, Vietnamese football (Soccer) player
Phạm Như Phương, Vietnamese artistic gymnast
Anathan "ana" Pham, Australian Dota 2 player
Tommy Pham, American baseball player

Religious figures
Phạm Công Tắc, first twelve disciples of Cao Dai
Phạm Minh Mẫn Cardinal Priest & Archbishop of Ho Chi Minh City in the Roman Catholic Church.

Fictional characters
Pham Tai, protagonist of the 18th century epic poem, Phạm Tải – Ngọc Hoa
Pham Thi La, a character in the Muv-Luv spin-off series Schwarzesmarken.

Other
 Nina Pham, U.S. nurse who became the first victim in the U.S. to acquire the Ebola virus disease through transmission in the U.S. during the 2014 West African Ebola outbreak
Phạm Đoan Trang Vietnamese human rights activist

See also
 Fàn (surname)
 Vietnamese name

References

External links
 https://web.archive.org/web/20070927024735/http://static.namesdatabase.com/names2/P/H/Pham.html

Vietnamese-language surnames
Surnames of Vietnamese origin